Greenwood is a historic freedom colony in Tulsa, Oklahoma. As one of the most prominent concentrations of African-American businesses in the United States during the early 20th century, it was popularly known as America's "Black Wall Street". It was burned to the ground in the Tulsa race massacre of 1921, in which a local white mob gathered and attacked the area. Between 75 and 300 Americans were killed, hundreds more were injured, and the homes of 5000 were destroyed, leaving them homeless. The massacre was one of the largest in the history of U.S. race relations, destroying the once-thriving Greenwood community.

Within ten years of the massacre, surviving residents who chose to remain in Tulsa rebuilt much of the district. They accomplished this despite the opposition of many white Tulsa political and business leaders and punitive rezoning laws enacted to prevent reconstruction. It continued as a vital black community until segregation was overturned by the federal government during the 1950s and 1960s. Desegregation encouraged black citizens to live and shop elsewhere in the city, causing Greenwood to lose much of its original vitality. Since then, city leaders have attempted to encourage other economic development activity nearby.

History

Roots
Many African Americans came to Oklahoma during the Native American removal. When these tribes came to Oklahoma, Africans held enslaved or living among them as tribal members (notably in the case of the Seminoles) were forced to move with them. This proved problematic as rules concerning the freedom of African Americans differed between tribes. Others later traveled to Oklahoma for the land rushes in 1889 through 1891 and continued in the years leading to 1907, the year Oklahoma became a state, hoping that a majority-black population could build a firewall against further extension of the system of racial degradation and segregation known as Jim Crow. Oklahoma represented the hope of change and provided a chance for African Americans to not only leave the lands of slavery but oppose the harsh racism of their previous homes. They travelled to Oklahoma by wagons, horses, trains, and even on foot.

Many of the settlers were relatives of Native Americans who had traveled on foot with the Five Civilized Tribes along the Trail of Tears. Others were the descendants of people who had fled to Indian Territory. Many Black residents were also from the various Muskogee-speaking peoples, such as Creeks and Seminoles, while some had been adopted by the tribes after the Emancipation Proclamation. 

White residents of Tulsa referred to the area north of the Frisco railroad tracks as "Little Africa." The success of Black-owned businesses there led Booker T. Washington to visit in 1905 and encourage residents to continue to build and cooperate among themselves, reinforcing what he called "industrial capacity" and thus securing their ownership and independence. Washington highlighted that he had directed the creation of a 4,000 acre totally black-owned district on the edge of Tuskegee, under the supervision of C. W. Greene, to model Washington's vision; it was named Greenwood and formally organized in 1901. The Tulsa community was formally organized the year after Washington's visit, 1906, with the name Greenwood. By 1921, it was home to about 10,000 black residents.

Greenwood Avenue in Tulsa was important because it ran north for over a mile from the Frisco Railroad yards, and it was one of the few streets that did not cross through both black and white neighborhoods. The citizens of Greenwood took pride in this fact because it was something they had all to themselves and did not have to share with the white community of Tulsa. Greenwood  was home to a thriving Black commercial district, whose many red brick buildings belonged to Black Americans and housed thriving businesses, including grocery stores, banks, libraries, and much more; one of the most affluent African-American communities in the country, leading to the nickname, "Black Wall Street."

O. W. Gurley

Around the start of the 20th century, O. W. Gurley, a wealthy black landowner from Arkansas, came to what was then known as Indian Territory to participate in the Oklahoma Land run of 1889. The young entrepreneur had just resigned from a presidential appointment under president Grover Cleveland in order to strike out on his own."

In 1906, Gurley moved to Tulsa, Oklahoma, where he purchased 40 acres of land which was "only to be sold to colored."

Among Gurley's first businesses was a rooming house which was located on a dusty trail near the railroad tracks. This road was given the name Greenwood Avenue, named for a city in Mississippi. The area became very popular among black migrants fleeing the oppression in Mississippi. They would find refuge in Gurley's building, as the racial persecution from the south was non-existent on Greenwood Avenue.

In addition to his rooming house, Gurley built three two-story buildings and five residences and bought an  farm in Rogers County. Gurley also founded what is today Vernon AME Church. He also helped build a black Masonic lodge and an employment agency.

This implementation of "colored" segregation set the Greenwood boundaries of separation that still exist:  Pine Street to the north, Archer Street and the Frisco tracks to the south, Cincinnati Street on the west, and Lansing Street on the east.

Another black American entrepreneur, J.B. Stradford and his wife Bertie Eleanor Wiley Stradford, arrived in Tulsa in 1899. He believed that black people had a better chance of economic progress if they pooled their resources, worked together and supported each other's businesses. He bought large tracts of real estate in the northeastern part of Tulsa, which he had subdivided and sold exclusively to other blacks. Gurley and a number of other blacks soon followed suit. Stradford later built the Stradford Hotel on Greenwood, where blacks could enjoy the amenities of the downtown hotels who served only whites. It was said to be the largest black-owned hotel in the United States.

In 1914, Gurley's net worth was reported to be $150,000 (about $3 million in 2018 dollars). And he was made a sheriff's deputy by the city of Tulsa to police Greenwood's residents, which resulted in some viewing him with suspicion. By 1921, Gurley owned more than one hundred properties in Greenwood and had an estimated net worth between $500,000 and $1 million (between $6.8 million and $13.6 million in 2018 dollars).

Gurley's prominence and wealth were short lived, and the authority vested in him as a sheriff's deputy was violently overwhelmed in the race massacre. In a matter of moments, the terrorist mob destroyed all he had built. During the race massacre, The Gurley Hotel at 112 N. Greenwood, the street's first commercial enterprise, valued at $55,000, was destroyed, and with it Brunswick Billiard Parlor and Dock Eastmand & Hughes Cafe. Gurley also owned a two-story building at 119 N. Greenwood. It housed Carter's Barbershop, Hardy Rooms, a pool hall, and cigar store. All were reduced to ruins. By his account and court records, the mob destroyed nearly $2.7 million in real estate (in 2018 dollars), and much of his life's work.
  
According to the memoirs of Greenwood pioneer, B.C. Franklin, Gurley left Greenwood for Los Angeles, California. Gurley and his wife, Emma, moved to a 4-bedroom home in South Los Angeles and ran a small hotel.  He was honored in a 2009 documentary film called, Before They Die! The Road to Reparations for the 1921 Tulsa Race Riot Survivors.

Black Wall Street
The Greenwood district in Tulsa came to be known as "Black Wall Street", one of the most commercially successful and affluent majority African-American communities in the United States. Booker T. Washington referred to the Greenwood neighborhood as “Negro Wall Street.” Many Americans, including African-Americans, had moved to Oklahoma in hopes of gaining a shot at quick economic gains through the mining and oil industries. Even though African-Americans constituted a small percentage of the overall population in Oklahoma, the percentage of African-Americans in Tulsa had significantly increased to around 12.3 percent during the oil boom. Many African-Americans had come from the Deep South and Kansas because of the opportunity to strike gold because of the rich oil fields. During the Jim Crow era, African-Americans were not allowed to make purchases or services in predominantly white areas. In particular, Oklahoma was known to have some of the harshest and most unjust Jim Crow laws in the country. Some economists theorize this forced many African-Americans to spend their money where they would feel welcomed, effectively insulating cash flow to within the black community and allowing Greenwood to flourish and prosper.

On "Black Wall Street", there were African-American attorneys, real estate agents, entrepreneurs, and doctors who offered their services in the neighborhood. One primary example of the black entrepreneurial spirit is illustrated by J.B. Stradford. He had graduated from Indiana University with a law degree and had moved to Greenwood to purchase various land vacancies in the area. After buying these vacant spaces, he would then sell them to African-American residents for redevelopment so that these empty spaces could be transformed into residential houses and profitable businesses. By 1921, Stradford had been considered one of the wealthiest African-Americans in the country as he owned numerous properties in Greenwood and even had his hotel named after him: Stratford Hotel. In addition to Mr. Stradford, there were also investments and reinvestments into the community. One executive of the local YMCA recalled that there were several barbershops, several grocery stores, and even a funeral home service. Greenwood was known to be an active religious community as there were numerous black-owned churches, Christian youth services, and other religious organizations.

Foundation of resentment  
Many white residents felt intimidated by the prosperity, growth, and size of "Black Wall Street." Not only was Greenwood, Tulsa expanding in population, it was expanding its physical boundaries, which eventually collided with the boundaries of white neighborhoods. According to several newspapers and articles at the time, there were reports of hateful letters sent to prominent business leaders within "Black Wall Street," which demanded that they stop overstepping their boundaries into the white segregated portion of Tulsa. White residents grew increasingly resentful about the wealth of the Greenwood community. The Tulsa Race Massacre of 1921 started when police accused a Black shoe shiner of assaulting a white woman.

1921 massacre

Improvements
Revitalization and preservation efforts in the 1990s and 2000s resulted in tourism initiatives and memorials. John Hope Franklin Greenwood Reconciliation Park and the Greenwood Cultural Center honor the victims of the Tulsa Race Massacre, although the Greenwood Chamber of Commerce plans a larger museum to be built with participation from the National Park Service.

In 2008, Tulsa announced that it sought to move the city's minor league baseball team, the Tulsa Drillers, to a new stadium, now known as ONEOK Field to be constructed in the Greenwood District. The proposed development includes a hotel, baseball stadium, and an expanded mixed-use district. Along with the new stadium, there will be extra development for the city blocks that surround the stadium.

The legacy of Tulsa Race Massacre 
After the Tulsa Race Massacre, many residents had promised to rebuild after the massive destruction. Within ten years after the massacre, surviving residents who chose to remain in Tulsa rebuilt much of the district. They accomplished this despite the opposition of many white Tulsa political and business leaders and punitive rezoning laws enacted to prevent reconstruction. There were over 240 black businesses in Greenwood in 1941. It continued as a vital black community until segregation was overturned by the federal government during the 1950s and 1960s. Desegregation encouraged black citizens to live and shop elsewhere in the city, causing Greenwood to lose much of its original vitality. Since then, city leaders have attempted to encourage other economic development activity nearby. Some residents attempted to sue the city and filed insurance claims against it, but all of those claims were denied by the city government. People within the African-American community after the Tulsa Race Massacre rarely discussed the historic significance of Greenwood after the Tulsa Race Massacre because of fear that it might occur again.

In 1996, a commission was established to examine recommendations to compensate and support the descendants of the victims of the 1921 Tulsa Race Massacre. In 2001, a final report was released that highly recommended that victims’ descendants receive full reparations. Alfred Brophy, an American legal scholar, outlined four specific reasons why survivors and their descendants should receive full compensation: the damage affected African-American families, the city was culpable, and city leaders acknowledged that they had a moral responsibility to help rebuild the infrastructure after the race massacre.

Historic status
The Greenwood Historic District comprises an area bounded by the Crosstown Expressway (I-244) on the north, Elgin Avenue on the west, Greenwood Avenue on the east and the Frisco tracks on the south. A portion of the area that was Greenwood historically extended into space occupied by the Expressway and is now occupied by the campus of Oklahoma State University–Tulsa.

The City of Tulsa submitted an application to the U.S. Department of the Interior, for the "Greenwood Historic District" on September 29, 2011. On August 8, 2012, the Coordinator of the National Register Program wrote the Tulsa Preservation Commission that the proposed District would be renamed as the Tulsa Race Riot of 1921. , the proposed Historic District had not been implemented.

Landmarks

Greenwood Rising History Center
The Greenwood Rising History Center will be built at 21 North Greenwood Avenue on the corner of Greenwood Avenue and Archer Street.  Construction of the History Center and 21 North Greenwood are expected to be completed in late May or June 2021.

Greenwood Cultural Center

The Greenwood Cultural Center, dedicated on October 22, 1995, was created as a tribute to Greenwood's history and as a symbol of hope for the community's future. It has a museum, an African American art gallery, a large banquet hall, and it housed the Oklahoma Jazz Hall of Fame until 2007. The total cost of the Center was almost $3 million. The Center plays a key role in the reconstruction and unity of the Greenwood Historic District.

The Greenwood Cultural Center sponsors and promotes education and cultural events showcasing African American heritage. It also provides positive images of North Tulsa to the community, and attracts a diversity of visitors to the Center and to the city of Tulsa.

In 2011, the Greenwood Cultural Center lost all funding from the State of Oklahoma, threatening its existence. The community responded with donations and GoFundMe campaigns, and the Cherokee Nation contributed to its summer programs.

Michael Bloomberg donated one million dollars to the Greenwood Art Project in 2019 and made the Greenwood Cultural Center his first stop on his campaign for the Democratic presidential nomination on January 19, 2020.

In 2021, President Joe Biden visited the Greenwood Cultural Center during the community's 100-year commemoration of the 1921 Tulsa Race Massacre.

John Hope Franklin Reconciliation Park
Ground was broken in 2008 at 415 North Detroit Avenue for a proposed Reconciliation Park to commemorate the 1921 Tulsa Race Massacre. John Hope Franklin, son of B. C. Franklin and a notable historian, attended the groundbreaking ceremony. After his death in 2009, the park was renamed John Hope Franklin Reconciliation Park. Attractions include two sculptures and a dozen bronze informational plaques. It is a park primarily designed for education and reflection, and does not contain facilities for sports or other recreation.

Originally funded by the State of Oklahoma, the City of Tulsa and private donors, it is now owned by the city and managed by a non-profit corporation, the John Hope Franklin Center for Reconciliation.

Notable people 

 Viola Fletcher, survivor of the Tulsa race massacre
 The Gap Band, R&B Group

See also 

 African American History
 Ethnic enclave
 History of Tulsa, Oklahoma
 Langston University
 Oklahoma State University–Tulsa
 Oklahoma Eagle newspaper

References

Further reading

 (fictional depiction)

External links
 Encyclopedia of Oklahoma History and Culture - Greenwood District
 Greenwood Cultural Center
 Greenwood Walking Tour
 Okjazz.org
 Tulsa.com
 Tulsapolice.org
 BatesLine. "The 1921 Tulsa Race Riot and the 90 years that followed." May 30, 2011.
 BatesLine. "Greenwood's streetcar: The Sand Springs Railroad." December 18, 2008.
 "Women of Black Wall Street."

African-American history in Tulsa, Oklahoma
African-American upper class
Ethnic enclaves in the United States
History of Tulsa, Oklahoma
Neighborhoods in Tulsa, Oklahoma
African-American society
Black elite
Populated places in Oklahoma established by African Americans